Gramme (or gram) is a unit of mass.

Gramme may also refer to:

Gramme (river), a river in Thuringia, Germany
Gramme-Aue, a former Verwaltungsgemeinschaft ("collective municipality") in Thuringia, Germany
Gramme-Vippach, a Verwaltungsgemeinschaft ("collective municipality") in Thuringia, Germany
Gramme machine, an electrical generator
2666 Gramme, a minor planet
Institut Gramme, a graduate school of engineering part of Haute École HELMo in Liege in Belgium

People with that surname
Zénobe Gramme (1826–1901), Belgian electrical engineer